In music theory of musical form, through-composed music is a continuous, non-sectional, and non-repetitive piece of music. The term is typically used to describe songs, but can also apply to instrumental music.

While most musical forms such as ternary form (ABA), rondo form (ABACABA), and sonata form (ABA') rely on repetition, through-composed music does not re-use material (ABCD). This constant introduction of new material is most noticeable in musical settings of poems, in contrast to the often used strophic form (AAA). Through-composed songs have different music for each stanza of the lyrics. The German word "durchkomponiert " is also used to indicate this concept.

Examples
Musicologist James Webster defines through-composed music in the following manner:

Many examples of this form can be found in Schubert's Lieder, where the words of a poem are set to music and each line is different. In his lied Erlkönig, in which the setting proceeds to a different musical arrangement for each new stanza and whenever the piece comes to each character, the character portrays its own voice register and tonality. Another example within instrumental music is Haydn's 'Farewell Symphony'.

Opera and musicals
The term "through-composed" is also applied to opera and musical theater to indicate a work that consists of an uninterrupted stream of music from beginning to end, as in the operas of Wagner, as opposed to having a collection of songs interrupted by recitative or spoken dialogue, as occurs in Baroque or Mozart's Italian- and German-language operas, respectively. Examples of the modern trend towards through-composed works in musical theater include the works of Andrew Lloyd Webber and Claude-Michel Schönberg. In musical theater, works with clear delineations between songs yet no spoken dialogue - such as Les Misérables or Hamilton - are usually referred to instead by the term "through-sung".

In popular music

While through-composed form is uncommon in popular music, several notable examples do exist:

"2 + 2 = 5" by Radiohead shifts through four main sections, none of which repeat. Starting with the first part (in ), each section gets progressively louder until the climax of the song's final portion.
Many Genesis songs, including "The Musical Box" and "Me and Sarah Jane", are through-composed.
Trey Anastasio, guitarist and vocalist of the band Phish, has written many compositions that utilize through-composed structure. Examples include "You Enjoy Myself" (the band's signature song), "Guyute", "Divided Sky", "Reba", and "Foam".

References

Musical form